Conglomerate Bay, Michigan was an unincorporated place on Isle Royale.  It had a post office for part of July 1878.

References

Notes

Sources

External links 
Satellite view of Conglomerate Bay

Populated places established in 1878
Isle Royale